H+/Cl− exchange transporter 3 is a protein that in humans is encoded by the CLCN3 gene.

Interactions 

CLCN3 has been shown to interact with PDZK1.

See also 
 Chloride channel

References

Further reading

External links 
 
 

Ion channels